Ludovic Loquet (born 4 February 1965) is a French politician who was the Member of Parliament for Pas-de-Calais's 6th constituency for a month in 2020.

References

See also 

 List of deputies of the 15th National Assembly of France

1965 births
Living people
Deputies of the 15th National Assembly of the French Fifth Republic
La République En Marche! politicians
21st-century French politicians
Members of Parliament for Pas-de-Calais